Ragnhild Øren Gulbrandsen (born 22 February 1977) is a Norwegian journalist and former football striker from the city of Trondheim who retired from football at the end of 2007.  Most of her playing career was spent with Trondheims-Ørn (Trondheim Eagles) women's football club, with whom she won the Norwegian elite league, the Toppserien, three times and the Cup four times, and was the club's top scorer in 1997, 2000 and 2001. As of April 2012, Gulbrandsen's 141 Toppserien goals made her third in the all-time goalscorer statistics.

In 2000 Gulbrandsen played in the Norway team which won gold at the Sydney Olympics, scoring Norway's second goal in the 3–2 final win against the USA.  She played as a professional in the US with Women's United Soccer Association (WUSA) club Boston Breakers in 2002 and 2003.

At the end of 2005 Gulbrandsen moved to Oslo to work as a journalist, and considered retiring from football.  But she joined Asker women's football club, and in the 2006 season when Asker won the Division 1 title, she twice scored six goals in a match.  She last played for Asker SK and the Norway national football team.

At the FIFA Women's World Cup 2007 tournament in China in 2007, Gulbrandsen scored six goals for Norway and won the Tournament's Bronze Shoe award as the third top scorer behind Marta of Brazil and Abby Wambach of the US.  Her international career, which was interrupted several times by injury, included 97 appearances for Norway at all levels, with 38 goals.  She later found employment as a journalist for Budstikka.

Ragnhild's father Odd Gulbrandsen played professional football for Rosenborg BK. She is not related to the contemporary Norwegian footballer Solveig Gulbrandsen.

International goals

References

External links
 
 
 Norwegian national team profile 
 Profile at Women's United Soccer Association

1977 births
Living people
Norwegian women's footballers
Norwegian expatriate women's footballers
SK Trondheims-Ørn players
Asker Fotball (women) players
Toppserien players
Boston Breakers (WUSA) players
Women's United Soccer Association players
Norway women's international footballers
Footballers at the 2000 Summer Olympics
Olympic footballers of Norway
Olympic gold medalists for Norway
Norwegian journalists
Norwegian expatriate sportspeople in the United States
Expatriate women's soccer players in the United States
Olympic medalists in football
1999 FIFA Women's World Cup players
2007 FIFA Women's World Cup players
People from Narvik
Women's association football forwards
Medalists at the 2000 Summer Olympics